The 2015 Italian motorcycle Grand Prix was the sixth round of the 2015 Grand Prix motorcycle racing season. It was held at the Mugello Circuit in Scarperia on 31 May 2015.

In the MotoGP class, Ducati's Andrea Iannone took his first pole position. However, Jorge Lorenzo won his third consecutive race ahead of Iannone and Valentino Rossi, who started from eighth on the grid. Honda's Marc Márquez was also running towards the front of the race, but he crashed out of the race at the three-quarter distance mark, while Andrea Dovizioso – third in the championship – was also forced to retire from the race, just after the halfway mark.

Classification

MotoGP

Moto2

Moto3

Championship standings after the race (MotoGP)
Below are the standings for the top five riders and constructors after round six has concluded.

Riders' Championship standings

Constructors' Championship standings

 Note: Only the top five positions are included for both sets of standings.

References

Italian
Motorcycle Grand Prix
Italian motorcycle Grand Prix
Italian motorcycle Grand Prix